Lexington station is a seasonal Amtrak station serving a former freight house in Lexington, North Carolina. It is served by Amtrak's Carolinian and Piedmont and is only open during the Lexington Barbecue Festival in October.

As part of the Depot District Redevelopment, a permanent station is planned to begin construction in 2022, completing in 2026, which will allow daily passenger service.

History
Currently, the station operates with a temporary platform near a former Southern Railway freight house, which is now the Lexington Farmer's Market. The freight house itself is used for festival activities, and is located along a pair of spur tracks. A third spur track is located between the main tracks and the side along the freight house. Though Amtrak gives the address as being at "Center Street at the railroad tracks," it is actually located around the corner along South Railroad Street. Center Street is located along a bridge over the tracks northeast of the freight house.

References

External links

Lexington Barbecue Festival Station – NC By Train

Amtrak stations in North Carolina
Buildings and structures in Davidson County, North Carolina
Transportation in Davidson County, North Carolina
Stations along Southern Railway lines in the United States